Beverley Rose (born 21 January 1964) is a British former swimmer. She competed in two events at the 1984 Summer Olympics.

References

External links
 

1964 births
Living people
British female swimmers
Olympic swimmers of Great Britain
Swimmers at the 1984 Summer Olympics
People from Amersham
Sportspeople from Buckinghamshire
Commonwealth Games medallists in swimming
Commonwealth Games bronze medallists for Scotland
Swimmers at the 1982 Commonwealth Games
20th-century British women
Medallists at the 1982 Commonwealth Games
Scottish female swimmers